Goran Pauk (born 23 April 1962) is a Croatian politician who served as Prefect of Šibenik-Knin County from 2006 to 2021. He has been the longest-serving prefect of the county since Croatia's independence in 1991.

Before entering politics, he was a professional football player.

References 

1962 births
Living people
Sportspeople from Šibenik
Association footballers not categorized by position
Yugoslav footballers
Croatian footballers
HNK Šibenik players
HNK Hajduk Split players
Yugoslav First League players
Croatian Football League players
Croatian Democratic Union politicians